Jiaoziya is a town in Yongding District, Zhangjiajie City, Hunan Province, China.

References

Towns of Hunan
Yongding District